Some notable professional autoharp performers include:
Bruce Good of The Good Brothers 
Jon Anderson
Brittain Ashford
Tina Louise Barr
Anonymous Boy
Bryan Bowers
Jeff Bridges
Amanda Brown
Basia Bulat
Maybelle Carter
June Carter Cash
Billy Connolly
Billy Corgan of The Smashing Pumpkins
Don Craine of Downliners Sect
Sheryl Crow
Grey DeLisle
Ed Droste of Grizzly Bear
Judy Dyble
Mary Epworth
Sylvia Fricker of Ian & Sylvia
KatieJane Garside of Ruby Throat, Queenadreena, Daisy Chainsaw
Marc Gunn
Steve Hackett
PJ Harvey
Peter Hayes of Black Rebel Motorcycle Club
Pomme
Linda McCartney
Imogen Heap of Frou Frou
Dorris Henderson
Brian Jones of The Rolling Stones
Kevin Cadogan of Third Eye Blind
Janis Joplin
Mark Kelly of Marillion
Babaji Bob Kindler
Natasha Khan and Ginger Lee of Bat for Lashes
Hayley Kiyoko
Glenn Kotche of Wilco
David Lindley
James Lowe of The Electric Prunes
Jeff Lynne
Jeff Martin of The Tea Party
Lyle Mays
Nick McCabe of The Verve
John McEnroe
Bill Miller of Roky Erickson and the Aliens
Joni Mitchell
Martin Molin of Wintergatan
Joanna Newsom
Johanna Söderberg (First Aid Kit (band))
Of Montreal
Dolly Parton
Roger Penney of Bermuda Triangle Band
Mike Pinder of The Moody Blues
Dax Pierson of Anticon-related groups Subtle, Themselves and 13 & God
Doug Pratt
Corinne Bailey Rae
Ratatat
Harvey Reid
John Sebastian of The Lovin' Spoonful
Mike Seeger
Karen Mueller
Amy Dutronc of Smokers Die Younger
Peggy Seeger
Jo Ann Smith
Kilby Snow
Jamie Stewart of Xiu Xiu
Pop Stoneman
Sunset Rubdown
Tommy Shaw of Styx
Rennie Sparks of The Handsome Family
Avey Tare
Tracey Thorn of Everything But The Girl, and solo
Matthew J. Tow of The Lovetones
Trixie Mattel
Steven Wilson
Patrick Wolf
Shara Worden of My Brightest Day

See also

List of accordionists
List of banjo players
List of cellists
List of didgeridoo players
List of euphonium players
List of flautists
List of guitarists
List of harmonicists

References

Autoharp